On the Double is a double album by Dutch rock band Golden Earring, released in 1969. It was the last album released under the name Golden Earrings as well as the last to feature drummer Jaap Eggermont, who left to pursue a career as a record producer, ultimately creating Stars on 45.

Track listing
All songs written by Kooymans except where noted.

"Song of a Devil's Servant" – 3:45
"Angelina" – 3:11
"Pam Pam Poope Poope Loux" – 2:44
"Hurry, Hurry, Hurry" – 4:23
"My Baby Ruby" – 3:18
"Judy" (Gerritsen)  – 1:44
"Goodbye Mama" – 3:09
"Murdock 9-6182" – 3:12
"Just a Little Bit of Peace in My Heart" – 5:20
"The Sad Story of Sam Stone" (Gerritsen) – 2:26
"High in the Sky" – 3:22
"Remember My Friend" (Gerritsen) – 2:57
"Time Is a Book" – 4:06
"Backbiting Baby" – 5:37
"I'm a Runnin'" – 3:27
"I Sing My Song" – 4:00
"Mitch Mover" – 3:00
"God Bless the Day" – 2:40
"The Grand Piano" (Gerritsen) – 3:26

Personnel
George Kooymans - guitar, vocals
Rinus Gerritsen - bass, keyboard
Barry Hay - flute, rhythm guitar, vocals
Jaap Eggermont - drums

Additional personnel
Gerard Beckers - sound engineer

Charts

References

Golden Earring albums
1969 albums
Polydor Records albums